Simeone de Michieli-Vitturi was a Dalmatian politician who served as the Mayor of Split, and a member of the 1867 Imperial Council.

References

1801 births
1868 deaths
People from Split, Croatia
People from the Kingdom of Dalmatia
Members of the Imperial Diet (Austria)
Members of the Austrian House of Deputies (1867–1870)
Mayors of Split, Croatia